Calauag, officially the Municipality of Calauag, is a 1st class municipality in the province of Quezon, Philippines. According to the 2020 census, it has a population of 71,809 people.

History 

According to the writings of Valentin Martin in his "Ensayo de una sintesis de los trabajos realizados sos las corporaciones religiosas Españolas de Filipinas", the first record of the establishment of a settlement in Calauag dates as far as the year 1584. However, the formal founding of the town by Spanish conquistadors was placed in the year 1851 with the union of the settlements in Apad and Calauag.

The first elected Captain of the town was Juan Sunog. In 1897 the town was placed the Revolutionary Government and Alipio Declaro became the Municipal President. In 1914 under Municipal President Marciano Roldan, the town was destroyed by fire for the first time in its history. On December 24, 1941, the town was occupied by the Japanese Imperial Army and on January 14, 1942, the town was again destroyed by fire. On April 19, 1945, the United States and Filipino forces liberated the town from Japanese occupation. The general headquarters of the Philippine Army and Constabulary under the Commonwealth regime was built and station in Calauag during and after the war from 1945 to 1946 against the possible remaining Japanese Armies.

Lost barangays to Bicol
Calauag experienced a big controversy due to a decade long boundary dispute with the town of Santa Elena in the Province of Camarines Norte which resulted in a Supreme Court case, Presidential intervention, and the loss of a quarter of its land area. The disputed barangays were Cabuluan, Don Tomas Morato, Guitol, Kagtalaba, Maulawin, Patag Ibaba, Patag Ilaya, Plaridel, and Tabugon.

On October 14, 1991, the Provincial Government and Municipal Government of Calauag ordered the demolition of a boundary marker installed by the DENR. In October 1995, then-President Fidel V. Ramos came to Calauag to meet with local officials to resolve the boundary dispute between the two provinces and surveyed the whole disputed area. Calauag retained its jurisdiction, however, the case was elevated to the Supreme Court. The Case of Province of Quezon vs. Province of Camarines Norte eventually ruled in favor of Camarines Norte and Calauag ceased its political jurisdiction on the said barangays.

Geography 
Calauag is located on the north-eastern end of Tayabas Isthmus. The Daang Maharlika or Pan-Philippine Highway runs at the town after Lopez in Southbound and after Santa Elena at the Northbound or from Manila. At the north end of Quirino Highway, it meets Daang Maharlika in Barangay Tabugon. It also meets the north end of Guinayangan Provincial Road which also meets Daang Maharlika in Barangay Sumulong. It is bounded to the north-west by Calauag Bay, south-west by Lopez, to the east by Guinayangan, and to the north by Basiad Bay and Tinig Bay; it is separated from Alabat Island by a 1 kilometer narrow strait.

Barangays 
Calauag is subdivided into 81 Barangays:

 Agoho
 Anahawan
 Anas
 Apad Lutao
 Apad Quezon
 Apad Taisan
 Atulayan
 Baclaran (Poblacion)
 Bagong Silang
 Balibago
 Bangkuruhan
 Bantolinao
 Barangay Uno (Poblacion)
 Barangay Dos (Poblacion)
 Barangay Tres (Poblacion)
 Barangay Cuatro (Poblacion)
 Barangay Cinco (Poblacion)
 Bigaan
 Binutas (Santa Brigida)
 Biyan
 Bukal
 Buli
 Dapdap
 Dominlog
 Doña Aurora
 Guinosayan
 Ipil
 Kalibo (Santa Cruz)
 Kapaluhan
 Katangtang
 Kigtan
 Kinamaligan
 Kinalin Ibaba
 Kinalin Ilaya
 Kumaludkud
 Kunalum
 Kuyaoyao
 Lagay
 Lainglaingan
 Lungib
 Mabini
 Madlangdungan
 Maglipad (Rosario)
 Maligaya
 Mambaling
 Manhulugin
 Marilag (Punaya)
 Mulay
 Pandanan
 Pansol
 Patihan
 Pinagbayanan (Poblacion)
 Pinagkamaligan (Poblacion)
 Pinagsakayan
 Pinagtalleran (Poblacion)
 Rizal Ibaba
 Rizal Ilaya
 Sabang Uno (Poblacion)
 Sabang Dos (Poblacion)
 Salvacion
 San Quintin
 San Roque Ibaba
 San Roque Ilaya
 Santa Cecilia
 Santa Maria (Poblacion)
 Santa Milagrosa
 Santa Rosa
 Santo Angel (Pangahoy)
 Santo Domingo
 Sinag
 Sumilang
 Sumulong
 Tabansak
 Talingting
 Tamis
 Tikiwan
 Tiniguiban
 Villa Magsino
 Villa San Isidro
 Viñas
 Yaganak

Town proper 
The town center (poblacion) consists of 12 barangays and 11 blocks from the PNR Station in the east to Pinagkamaligan ES on the west. Going west from Barangay Pinagtalleran via Quezon Street, there are five blocks of high concentration of shops, groceries, and banks.

The Government Center is located in the south of the town which consists of Municipal Hall which houses the City Library, Fire Station, Police Station and Precinct, and the Municipal Council building. Quezon Plaza is a well-used spot for programs and events. The Livelihood Center is two blocks away from the plaza and Quezon Street. Central Park is also located in front of the plaza and the City Hall.

Land area
Calauag has a land area size of 324.71 km2 (125.37 sq mi). Its land is three times bigger than San Francisco, California 121.51 km2 (46.91 sq mi) and almost half-smaller than the size of Singapore 728.3 km2 (281.2 sq mi).

Climate

Calauag has a tropical climate, like most of the country. Summers are hot and dry while the rainy season is cold and wet . It also falls under the Type IV Tropical Climate which has rainfall is more or less evenly distributed throughout the year. Rainy season must be expected from end of May to last week of December.

Demographics

Economy 

Calauag has an agricultural-based economy. Most economic activity happens in Municipal Market and its vicinity. Most agricultural products are coconut-based and followed by rice, corn, fish, crabs and other seafoods. It is currently classified as First class-municipality.

Government
The mayor for the 2019–2022 term is Rosalina O. Visorde, wife of former Mayor Luisito S. Visorde. Leah Dela Cruz is the town's incoming vice mayor. Under the 1987 Constitution, The mayor is restricted to three consecutive terms with three years per term, although a mayor can be elected again after an interruption of one term. The mayor has the direct control of the departments while the Municipal Administrator is indirectly in charge of all departments of the Government while the Vice Mayor is in charge of the Municipal Council which consists of seven Councilors and one Municipal Sangguniang Kabataan/SK (Youth Council) Chairman and a President of Liga ng mga Barangay which are elected every three years and Municipal Administrator is appointed by the mayor.

Congressional and provincial legislators
In the 18th Congress of the House of Representatives, Calauag is Represented by Helen Tan of the Fourth Congressional District of Quezon province. Representative Tan is now term-limited. The disputed barangays meanwhile are under First Congressional District of Camarines Norte, Represented by Josefina "Josie" B. Tallado. However, the disputed barangays still receive funds from some of the board members of Quezon Province.

In the Provincial Board, the 4th District of Quezon is represented by four incoming board members for the 2019–2022 term: Roderick "Derick" Magbuhos (NPC), Rhodora "Dhoray" Tan (NP) and Isaias Ubana II (NPC).

List of former chief executive

Tourism

 Capaluhan Beach
 Pulong Pasig
 Pangahoy Beach
 Santa Milagrosa Cave
 Calauag Central Park
 Calauag Crossing
 Quezon Plaza
 Yaganak Hanging Bridge
 The "C" Lighthouse
 Quezon Canal
 Calauag Municipal Library
 Pinagtalleran Playground
 Calauag East Central Elementary School
 Morato Family Ancestral House

Infrastructure

Transportation
Calauag is accessible by Land Transportation like bus, and train via PNR Hondagua of Bicol Express Service. Calauag Station is currently under renovation due to damages of Typhoons and Storms and the Intercity Service is currently defunct. Traveling around the town proper is no problem since there are thousands of tricycles circling the Town Proper.

Utilities
Quezon I Electric Cooperative (QUEZELCO 1) provides Electricity to the entire 3rd and 4th congressional districts including Santa Elena, Camarines Norte and Del Gallego, Camarines Sur. Calauag Water District (CWD) provides potable water to the residents of the Town Proper and nearby barangays (villages). The Yaganak-Mambaling Dam is the source of water for the entire town. The Local, NDD and Fiber internet are provided by PLDT which absorbed the local franchise of Santos Telephone Corporation. The wireless network and internet are provided by national telecommunications companies PLDT (Smart and Sun Cellular), Globe and Dito. Digital Cable Television is provided by local cable operator (Calauag CATV System) and national satellite television providers (Cignal, G Sat, and previously prior to lapse of congressional franchise, SkyDirect). Liquified petroleum gas meanwhile may be purchased per cylinder tanks in gasoline stations or in local distributors.

Education

Public Schools

Public Schools are operated by the Department of Education, Division of Quezon and divided by two districts: The East District and The West District. There are also one public high school that operates inside the town proper.
 Sabang Elementary School (K-6) on Quezon Street Ext.
 Pinagkamaligan Elementary School (K-6) on Rizal Street Ext.
 Calauag East Central Elementary School (K-6) on Declaro Street, between Bonifacio Street and Rizal Street
 Municipal Sector Elementary School (K-6) on Rizal Street beside the East Central Elementary School
 Santa Maria Elementary School (K-6) on Rizal Street
 Calauag National High School (7-12/Junior High School-Senior High School) on Maharlika Highway
 South Luzon State University, Calauag Extension Campus in New Municipal Hall Complex

Private Schools
 Calauag Central College (K-12+College level) on Rizal Street corner Arguelles Street
 Saint Peter's School (Catholic, Parochial School) (Junior High School-College level) on Rizal Street beside the Saint Peter Parish
 Froebelian School of Calauag, Inc. (K–Grade 6) on Barangay Cinco
 Enverga University

Media
Calauag and nearby towns were being served by Radyo Natin 100.9 FM and QuezoNews-FM 94.5

Sister cities 
Historically, the sister cities of Calauag are Guinayangan, Tagkawayan (Daughter town of Guinayangan), and Buenavista (then Piris).

Notable personalities

Rey Danseco – Award winner-International Boxing Judge, journalist, TV Host, Radio Commentator
Ice Seguerra – Former host Eat Bulaga!, singer, Former National Youth Commission chairman
Marcelito Pomoy—Singer, Pilipinas and America's Got Talent contestant
Alisha del Campo—Member, Philippine Women's National Football Team
Edelyn Cornejo – former Star Circle Kid Questor, child actress
Maria Regine Maravilla Talento – Star Circle Kid Questor, child actress
Madeleine Nicolas – stage and film actress
Gerry Igos – 1989 Philippine cycling champion
Romeo Asinas – stuntman & fight scene instructor
Tomas Morato – Last Municipal President (Jan. 1935-Dec. 1937) first Municipal Mayor of Calauag (Jan 1938 – Dec 1940) . First Representative of the 2nd District of Tayabas
 Arturo Morato Sr.- First licensed pilot (1936) and first Mayor of Tagkawayan, Quezon. 
Manoling Morato – PCSO and Movie and Television Review and Classification Board Chairman and former TV host
Raymundo Punongbayan – Former director, Philippine Institute of Volcanology and Seismology

Gallery

References

External links 

Calauag Profile at PhilAtlas.com
[ Philippine Standard Geographic Code]
Philippine Census Information
Local Governance Performance Management System
Quezon Province Web Portal

Municipalities of Quezon